Toshavim ("residents") is a generic reference to non-Sephardic Jews who inhabited lands in which the Jews expelled from Spain in 15th century settled ("Megorashim", "expellees"). The indigenous Jews in the area of North Africa known as Maghreb are also referred to as Maghrebim (Maghrebi Jews). In particular, the term "Toshavim" was applied to the indigenous Jews of Morocco.

Toshavim had their own minhagim (Judaic traditions) and they spoke Judeo-Arabic or Judeo-Berber dialects. 

The new arrivals did not always deal well with the local Jews. For example, in Algiers they called the local Jews derisively "turban-wearers" and vice versa, the Spanish Jews were called "beret-wearers".

Despite the fact that Toshavim were apparently overwhelmed an absorbed by Sephardic immigrants, the differences in many areas of communal lives of Toshavim and Megorashim persisted for very long time: separate negidim, separate synagogues, separate teachers, separate cemeteries, etc. For example, in Fez, Morocco, the common minhag for (most of) the two communities was accepted only in 18th century.

See also
Berber Jews
Musta'arabi Jews
, a severe halakhic controversy about a specific type of terefah, among the Fez Jewry between Toshavim and Megorashim

References

Maghrebi Jews
Jewish Moroccan history
Jewish Algerian history
Jewish Tunisian history
Hebrew words and phrases